Catholic Independent Schools Vancouver Archdiocese is an organization that oversees Catholic education for young people in the greater Vancouver area.  It manages 39 elementary schools and 7 secondary schools in the Archdiocese of Vancouver.

The secondary schools are:
Archbishop Carney Regional Secondary School
 Holy Cross Regional High School
 Notre Dame Regional Secondary School
 St. John Brebeuf Regional Secondary
 St. John Paul II Academy
 St. Patrick Regional Secondary School
 St. Thomas Aquinas Catholic High School

The elementary schools are:
 Assumption School (Powell River)
 Blessed Sacrament
 Cloverdale Catholic
 Corpus Christi
 Holy Cross
 Holy Trinity
 Immaculate Conception (Delta)
 Immaculate Conception (Vancouver)
 Our Lady of Fatima
 Our Lady of Good Counsel
 Our Lady of Mercy
 Our Lady of Perpetual Help
 Our Lady of Sorrows
 Our Lady of the Assumption
 Queen of All Saints
 Sacred Heart
 St. Andrew's
 St. Anthony of Padua (Vancouver)
 St. Anthony's (West Vancouver)
 St. Augustine's 
 St. Bernadette's
 St. Catherine's
 St. Edmund's
 St. Francis de Sales
 St. Francis of Assisi
 St. Francis Xavier
 St. Helen's
 St. James
 St. Joseph's
 St. Joseph the Worker
 St. Jude's
 St. Mary's (Chilliwack)
 St. Mary's (Vancouver)
 St. Matthew's
 St. Michael's
 St. Patrick's (Maple Ridge)
 St. Patrick's (Vancouver)
 St. Paul's
 St. Pius X
 Star of the Sea

See also
School District 39 Vancouver

External links
 http://www.cisva.bc.ca/ CISVA - Catholic Independent Schools Vancouver Archdiocese

School districts in British Columbia